Upper Hunter Valley may refer to:
 Part of the Hunter Region, a geographical region of New South Wales, Australia
 A wine-producing region in the Hunter Region